KPCL (95.7 FM) is a Christian radio station licensed to Farmington, New Mexico, serving the areas of Farmington, New Mexico and Durango, Colorado. The station is owned by Voice Ministries of Farmington, Inc.

References

External links
KPCL's official website

PCL (FM)
Farmington, New Mexico